The statue of George Palmer stands in Palmer Park, in Reading, Berkshire.  The statue, by George Blackall Simonds, was unveiled in 1891, though it was originally in Broad Street and only later moved to Palmer Park.  The statue has been classed Grade II Listed monument since 14 December 1978.

Overview 

The statue was given by the towns-folk of Reading, "in recognition of his services and gifts to the town", and unveiled 4 November 1891, the same day of the opening of the 49 acre Palmer Park.  Four thousand subscribed to the cost of the statue.  The opening of the park and the  unveiling of the statue have been described as "the biggest celebration Reading had ever seen.

It was originally sited in Broad Street, but was moved in 1930 to its current location.

The statue depicts Palmer, standing, with top hat and umbrella clasped in his right hand, while his left holds his lapel.  It was the first statue in Britain with an umbrella. The statue was unveiled on 14 November 1891, the same day that Palmer Park was given to the city.

The statue is in bronze, mounted on a substantial pink granite plinth, with moulded cornice and base.

Subject 
George Palmer (1818–1897) was a Quaker baker, known for his partnership with Thomas Huntley, which formed the biscuit firm Huntley and Palmers.  Palmer invented machinery which stamped biscuits in bulk.  A noted philanthropist, he gave the site of Palmer Park to Reading in 1891, as well as King's Meadow.  His family also donated the site of Reading University.  The borough also granted him Freedom of the City, the first person ever honoured thus, in recognition of his many contributions to civic life.

Artist 

George Blackall Simonds (1843–1929) was a Reading sculptor and director of H & G Simonds Brewery. He exhibited consistently at the Royal Academy. Simonds studied under Johannes Schilling in Dresden, and Louis Jehotte at The Academy of Brussels. He created over 200 pieces in many different media.

While The Falconer (1873) is in Central Park, New York, much of his larger work is to be found in or near Reading.  Substantial pieces were also commissioned for Indian locations, Allahabad and Calcutta. 

The Maiwand Lion (1866) in the Forbury Gardens is his, the statue of Queen Victoria at the Town Hall and the statue of H. Blandy, another mayor of Reading. In 1922 he designed the war memorial at Bradfield, Berkshire, which commemorated the deaths of local men in the First World War including his son, a lieutenant with the South Wales Borderers.

References

Further reading
 Reading University, special collections, HP OS 508 Scrap book

External links

 Palmer statue and Huntley and Palmer's delivery van c 1920 (original in Reading Museum)

Sculptures by George Blackall Simonds
s
g
s
Palmer, George
s